Hippopsis is a genus of beetles in the family Cerambycidae, containing the following species:

 Hippopsis albicans Breuning, 1940
 Hippopsis apicalis (Bates, 1866)
 Hippopsis araujoi Martins & Galileo, 2006
 Hippopsis arriagadai Martins & Galileo, 2003
 Hippopsis assimilis Breuning, 1940
 Hippopsis bivittata Martins & Galileo, 2003
 Hippopsis brevicollis Martins & Galileo, 2003
 Hippopsis brevithorax Galileo & Martins, 2007
 Hippopsis campaneri Martins & Galileo, 1998
 Hippopsis densepunctata Breuning, 1940
 Hippopsis femoralis Breuning, 1940
 Hippopsis fractilinea Bates, 1866
 Hippopsis fratercula Galileo & Martins, 1988
 Hippopsis freyi Breuning, 1955
 Hippopsis gilmouri Breuning, 1962
 Hippopsis griseola Bates, 1866
 Hippopsis insularis Breuning, 1962
 Hippopsis iuasanga Martins & Galileo, 2006
 Hippopsis lemniscata (Fabricius, 1801)
 Hippopsis lineolatus Lepeletier & Audinet-Serville, 1825
 Hippopsis macrophthalma Breuning, 1940
 Hippopsis meinerti Aurivillius, 1900
 Hippopsis minima Galileo & Martins, 1988
 Hippopsis monachica Berg, 1889
 Hippopsis mourai Martins & Galileo, 1994
 Hippopsis nigroapicalis Martins & Galileo, 2003
 Hippopsis ocularis Galileo & Martins, 1995
 Hippopsis pallida Carvalho, 1981
 Hippopsis pertusa Galileo & Martins, 1988
 Hippopsis pradieri Guérin-Méneville, 1844
 Hippopsis prona Bates, 1866
 Hippopsis pubiventris Galileo & Martins, 1988
 Hippopsis quadrivittata Breuning, 1940
 Hippopsis quinquelineata Aurivillius, 1920
 Hippopsis rabida Galileo & Martins, 1988
 Hippopsis renodis Galileo & Martins, 1988
 Hippopsis septemlineata Breuning, 1940
 Hippopsis septemvittata Breuning, 1940
 Hippopsis tibialis Martins & Galileo, 2003
 Hippopsis truncatella Bates, 1866
 Hippopsis tuberculata Galileo & Martins, 1988

References

 
Agapanthiini